Jaroslav Kentoš (born 14 May 1974) is a former football player from Slovakia and current manager of Slovakia U21. He spent successful period of coaching as a manager of ŽP Šport Podbrezová. He played in the Gambrinus liga for Bohemians Prague.

Honours

Manager
ŽS Podbrezová
DOXXbet liga: Winners: 2013–14 (Promoted)

External links
 at fkdukla.sk

References

1974 births
Living people
People from Vranov nad Topľou
Sportspeople from the Prešov Region
Slovak footballers
Association football defenders
Slovak football managers
Slovak expatriate footballers
1. FC Tatran Prešov players
Maccabi Haifa F.C. players
Bohemians 1905 players
ŠK Slovan Bratislava players
FK Dukla Banská Bystrica players
Hapoel Kfar Saba F.C. players
ŠK Futura Humenné players
FK Železiarne Podbrezová players
Liga Leumit players
Czech National Football League players
Israeli Premier League players
2. Liga (Slovakia) players
FK Železiarne Podbrezová managers
MŠK Žilina managers
Slovakia national under-21 football team managers
3. Liga (Slovakia) managers
2. Liga (Slovakia) managers
Slovak Super Liga managers
Expatriate footballers in Israel
Slovak expatriate sportspeople in Israel
Expatriate footballers in the Czech Republic
Slovak expatriate sportspeople in the Czech Republic